Carlton Anthony Chapman (13 April 197112 October 2020) was an Indian professional footballer who also served as technical director of Quartz International Football Academy. As player, Chapman played as a midfielder for the India national team between 1995 and 2001 and also captained the side. At the club level, he had a successful career, having had two spells with East Bengal and one with JCT Mills.

As a coach, Chapman had a six-year spell with I-League 2nd Division club Tata Football Academy from 2002 to 2008, followed by Royal Wahingdoh FC and Students Union of the Bangalore Super Division. Between 2016 and 2017 he was the head coach of Sudeva Moonlight FC, a Delhi-based I-League 2nd Division football club and residential academy.

Playing career
Chapman began his club career with Sai Centre, Bangalore, in the mid-1980s. He then played for Southern Blues, a Bangalore club, before joining the Tata Football Academy as a cadet in 1990. He stayed with the club until 1993 after graduating the previous year, before signing for East Bengal. He had a fruitful two years at East Bengal captaining the team in 1999–2000, until signed by JCT Mills in 1995. In 1993, his first season with Bengal, he scored a hat-trick against the Iraqi club Al-Zawra at the Asian Cup Winners' Cup, a match that Bengal won 6–2.

During his spell at JCT Mills, the team won 14 tournaments, with a team that had I. M. Vijayan and Baichung Bhutia, both of whom are regarded as India's all-time greats. After one season with FC Kochin in 1997–98, Chapman returned to his former club East Bengal in 1998. The team won the National Football League under his captaincy in 2001, before he announced his retirement from professional football.

In the Santosh Trophy, Chapman played for Karnataka, Punjab and West Bengal.

Coaching career

2002–2013
Following his retirement as a player, Chapman coached the Tata Football Academy team, then in I-League 2nd Division, from 2002 to 2008. He was signed in December 2002 on a one-year contract as an assistant to head coach Ranjan Choudhary and assistant coach Vijay Kumar.

He quit in 2008, after the team was not allowed to play in the first division by its management even after having qualified. During these years, he had stints with the Indian under-19 team as an assistant coach and with the Jharkhand under-19 team in 2003 and 2005. Following his departure from Tata Football Academy, he had a stint with a New Delhi club, Royal Rangers, in 2008. He was then approached by Royal Wahingdoh, a club based in Shillong. He guided the team to three successive Shillong Premier League wins, and the Bordoloi Trophy win in 2011.

2013–2017
In 2013, Chapman was signed by Bhawanipore FC, a Kolkata-based club, that played in the I-League 2nd Division, after they failed to qualify for the first division by a point in the previous season. In 2014, he joined Students Union that competed in the Bangalore Super Division. In 2017, he joined Sudeva Moonlight, a club based in Delhi, as an assistant coach. Under him, the club got promoted to the I-League 2nd Division. In December 2017, Chapman was appointed the Technical Director of the Kozhikode-based Quartz International Football Academy.

Death
Chapman died of a heart attack in Bangalore on 12 October 2020.

Honours

India
SAFF Championship: 1997, 1999; runner-up: 1995
 South Asian Games Gold medal: 1995

East Bengal
IFA Shield: 2000

Bengal
Santosh Trophy: 1998–99

See also

List of India national football team captains

References

External links
 
 Charlton Chapman, Indian football Hall of famer

1971 births
Indian footballers
Footballers from Bangalore
Anglo-Indian people
Association football midfielders
India international footballers
Indian football coaches
2020 deaths
Footballers at the 1998 Asian Games
Asian Games competitors for India
Sudeva Delhi FC managers
South Asian Games medalists in football
South Asian Games gold medalists for India